Yantar (Янтарь) is a special purpose intelligence collection ship built for the Russian Navy. The ship has been operated by the Russian Navy's Main Directorate of Underwater Research (GUGI) since 2015 and is reportedly a spy ship. The vessel's home port is Severomorsk, where it is attached to the Northern Fleet. It is the lead ship of its class, with two sister ships under construction.

Design and construction
Yantar was designed by the CMDB Almaz Design Bureau in St. Petersburg, and the hull was laid down on 8 July 2010. It was launched in December 2012, and concluded its sea trials in May 2015. It officially has a complement of 60. The ship was built at the Yantar Shipyard in Kaliningrad.

Roles
Yantar can act as a mothership to mini-subs. The United States Navy has stated that the submersibles are able to sever cables miles beneath the ocean's surface. The submersibles are reportedly the project 16810 Rus-class submersible and the project 16811 .

According to Alexei Burilichev, head of the Russian Defense Ministry's deepwater research department, Yantar is an oceanic research complex.

Activities
Yantar has been reported in position near undersea telecommunications cables.

In 2015, Yantar was spotted off the coast of Guantánamo Bay, Cuba.

Summer 2016, Yantar was anchored outside Nuuk, Greenland.

In 2017, Yantar was active in the eastern Mediterranean, near an undersea cable linking Israel to Cyprus. It was also reportedly used to recover "secret equipment" from crashed Su-33 and MiG-29 aircraft.

On 23 November 2017, upon an order of  Russian President Vladimir Putin, Yantar and the specialists of the Russian Navy's 328th expedition search and rescue unit were sent to Argentina's coast to search for the Argentine submarine  that went missing on 15 November 2017.

In Summer 2018, she was deployed to Mediterranean off the Syrian coast.

In November 2019, Yantar visited Trinidad and Tobago.

In February 2020, Yantar was found near Rio de Janeiro submarine cables by Brazilian Navy. The crew evaded questions about their intents and turned off the ship identification systems. In late March, Yantar was anchored off the Baie de la Seine, a few weeks before the Suffren first sea trial out of Cherbourg.

In August 2021, Yantar was spotted off the coast of Ireland, running parallel to AEConnect-1 and the expected route of the Celtic Norse submarine communications cable.

Sister ships

Almaz
A sister Project 22010-class ship Almaz is also under construction.

Burilichev
On 5 February 2021, the third ship of the series was reportedly laid down in the Vyborg Shipyard under the name Vice-admiral Burilichev, to honor a former head of the GUGI, Alexey Vitalyevich Burilichev, who died in November 2020 due to coronavirus.

References

Naval ships of Russia
Ships built at Yantar Shipyard
2012 ships
Electronic intelligence ships